Kimbirila or Kinbirila is the name of two villages in the department of Denguélé, Côte d'Ivoire:

Kimbirila-Nord, a subprefecture (sous-préfecture) of the department of Minignan
Kimbirila-Sud, a subprefecture (sous-préfecture) of the department of Odienné